Elizabeth Tollet (March 11, 1694 – February 1, 1754) was a British poet. Her surviving works are varied; she produced translations of classical themes, religious and philosophical poetry and poems arguing for women's involvement in education and intellectual pursuits such as natural philosophy. Unusually, for a woman of her time, her poetry also includes Newtonian imagery and ideas. Some of her poetry imitates the Latin verse of Horace, Ovid, and Virgil. In some of her poems, Tollet paraphrases the Psalms.

She was the daughter of George Tollet who, observing her intelligence, gave her a thorough education in languages, history, poetry and mathematics. Tollet was fluent in Latin, Italian, and French and she achieved a proficiency in Latin that was unconventional for women of her time. The Tollets' social circle included Isaac Newton, who also encouraged her to pursue her education.

Tollet grew up in the Tower of London where her father lived as a commissioner of the British Navy. She refers to the Tower in several of her poems and expresses her confinement and frustration with it. Tollet remained unmarried her whole life. Her mother most likely died and Tollet, being the eldest daughter, would've been expected to stay home and care for her siblings.

In 1724 she published Poems on Several Occasions, which included her Hypatia, now seen as a feminist protest poem.

On Newton's death in 1727 Tollet produced an elegy, On the Death of Sir Isaac Newton.

She died in 1754 in the village of Westham, Essex (now known as West Ham) and is buried at All Saints church there.

References 

English women poets
1694 births
1754 deaths
18th-century English women writers
18th-century English women
18th-century English people